Bawm or Bawm Chin may be,

Bawm people
Bawm language